Trusler Sports Complex is a sports facility located in Emporia, Kansas. The complex consists of four fields – one baseball, three softball – and is home to the Emporia State baseball and softball teams.

History
The complex opened in 1992 after a local-based not-for profit foundation – Trusler Foundation – donated money to Emporia State University. Both Emporia State baseball and softball teams compete here; Baseball on Glennen Field (named after Emporia State's 13th president), and softball on Turnbull Field (named after J. Michael Turnbull, who was president of Trusler Foundation). The two other softball fields – Cannon Field and Thomas Field – are named in honor of Joe Cannon who provided the land for the complex and Tom D. Thomas, treasurer and trustee of the Trusler Foundation.

Renovations
Since its opening in 1992, Trusler has seen many improvements. In 2006, a clubhouse was built. In 2009, Glennen Field received artificial turf for the infield, with softball receiving the same in 2014. In 2014, nearly $400,000 was donated to improved dugouts and build a new ticket booth.

References

Buildings and structures in Lyon County, Kansas
Emporia State Hornets baseball
1992 establishments in Kansas
Sports venues completed in 1992
Baseball venues in Kansas
Softball venues in Kansas
College baseball venues in the United States
College softball venues in the United States